Toby Keith's I Love This Bar & Grill is a restaurant chain inspired by the country music singer Toby Keith and founded by Boomtown Entertainment. The bar is named after Keith's 2003 single "I Love This Bar", which was taken from his eighth studio album Shock'n Y'all.

Toby Keith's Bar & Grill locations operate as full-service restaurants with large bars in the shape of guitars. They primarily serve American cuisine, especially Southern food. The bars regularly have live musical entertainment from local performers without a cover charge. Keith himself has made surprise visits to franchises, where he performs and socializes with fans.

Locations 

The first Toby Keith's I Love This Bar & Grill restaurants opened in 2005 in Oklahoma, Keith's native state, in Oklahoma City and at the Hard Rock Hotel and Casino in Tulsa. Restaurants in Thackerville, Oklahoma and in Las Vegas, Nevada, soon followed. The Oklahoma locations are operated by the Hal Smith Restaurant Group of Norman, Oklahoma.

In spring 2009, a new Toby Keith's I Love This Bar & Grill was opened in Mesa, Arizona.  Later in 2010 new restaurants were opened in St. Louis Park, Minnesota and in Denver, Colorado at Northfield Stapleton.

In April 2010, the New England Patriots announced that the first New England I Love This Bar & Grill was to be located at the Patriot Place complex outside Gillette Stadium in Foxborough, Massachusetts. It opened in May 2011.

In March 2011, a Dallas location was announced for half of the former AMC Grand 24 multiplex. That location opened on May 15, 2012, with a formal grand opening in September 2012. When it opened, the Dallas location was the second-largest in the chain.

Other locations existed in Peoria, Arizona, Cincinnati, Ohio, City Center at Oyster Point in Newport News, Virginia and Rancho Cucamonga, California and Rosemont, Illinois until 2015. In early 2013 a location opened in Syracuse, New York at the newly constructed Destiny USA.

Closings 
Throughout 2014 and 2015, multiple locations were closed abruptly.

2014
In January, 2014, the location in Dallas, Texas closed abruptly for not paying their rent.

On March 7, 2014, the location in Tucson, Arizona, closed abruptly after being evicted by General Growth Properties for breach of contract.

On December 30, 2014, the location in Folsom, California, closed abruptly.  It had been open since 2012.

2015
On January 1, 2015, the location at City Center in Newport News, Virginia, closed.  At the time of their eviction, the restaurant owed City Center more than $554,000 in delinquent rent and fees.

On January 3, 2015, the location in Houston, Texas, closed due to unpaid rent.

On May 2, 2015, the location in Woodbridge, Virginia, closed.

On April 7, 2015, the location in the Savannah Mall in Savannah, Georgia, was given their final notice of eviction.  The restaurant that was to open August 2014 never did.

On May 3, 2015, the location at The Collection at RiverPark in Oxnard, California, closed after being open less than a year.  As of September 28, 2014, they were behind over $605,000 in back rent.

On May 17, 2015, the location in the Destiny USA mall in Syracuse, New York, closed abruptly and without notice amid rumors of a rent dispute with the mall owners.

On June 3, 2015, the location at The Wharf in Orange Beach, Alabama, was padlocked and posted with a notice of eviction.

On June 24, 2015, the location at St. Louis Park, Minnesota, closed abruptly.

On July 2, 2015, the location at Artegon Marketplace in Orlando, Florida, closed abruptly. It had opened in late December 2014.

On July 13, 2015, the location in Cincinnati closed.

On September 3, 2015, it was announced that the location in Phoenix, Arizona, had closed. The other Arizona location, in Peoria, had closed previously over the summer.

On September 14, 2015, the location at Victoria Gardens, in Rancho Cucamonga, California, became the latest restaurant in the chain to close without any notice.

In September 2015, the Northfield location in Denver, Colorado, closed abruptly. The City of Denver auctioned off all contents in October 2015 to recoup over $70,000 in back taxes.

In October 2015, the Rosemont, Illinois, location closed.

On September 9, 2015, the location at the Great Lakes Crossing Outlets in Auburn Hills, Michigan, closed permanently after having their liquor license suspended due to repeated violations.

2019
On January 29, 2019, the location at Patriot Place in Foxborough, Massachusetts, closed abruptly.

See also 
 Cheeseburger in Paradise (restaurant)
 Hard Rock Cafe
 Jimmy Buffett's Margaritaville

References

External links 
Official website

2005 establishments in Oklahoma
Drinking establishment chains in the United States
Restaurant chains in the United States
Restaurants established in 2005